Breast cancer is cancer that develops from breast tissue. Signs of breast cancer may include a lump in the breast, a change in breast shape, dimpling of the skin, milk rejection, fluid coming from the nipple, a newly inverted nipple, or a red or scaly patch of skin. In those with distant spread of the disease, there may be bone pain, swollen lymph nodes, shortness of breath, or yellow skin.

Risk factors for developing breast cancer include obesity, a lack of physical exercise, alcoholism, hormone replacement therapy during menopause, ionizing radiation, an early age at first menstruation, having children late in life or not at all, older age, having a prior history of breast cancer, and a family history of breast cancer. About 5–10% of cases are the result of an inherited genetic predisposition, including BRCA mutations among others. Breast cancer most commonly develops in cells from the lining of milk ducts and the lobules that supply these ducts with milk. Cancers developing from the ducts are known as ductal carcinomas, while those developing from lobules are known as lobular carcinomas. There are more than 18 other sub-types of breast cancer. Some, such as ductal carcinoma in situ, develop from pre-invasive lesions. The diagnosis of breast cancer is confirmed by taking a biopsy of the concerning tissue. Once the diagnosis is made, further tests are done to determine if the cancer has spread beyond the breast and which treatments are most likely to be effective.

The balance of benefits versus harms of breast cancer screening is controversial. A 2013 Cochrane review found that it was unclear if mammographic screening does more harm than good, in that a large proportion of women who test positive turn out not to have the disease. A 2009 review for the US Preventive Services Task Force found evidence of benefit in those 40 to 70 years of age, and the organization recommends screening every two years in women 50 to 74 years of age. The medications tamoxifen or raloxifene may be used in an effort to prevent breast cancer in those who are at high risk of developing it. Surgical removal of both breasts is another preventive measure in some high risk women. In those who have been diagnosed with cancer, a number of treatments may be used, including surgery, radiation therapy, chemotherapy, hormonal therapy, and targeted therapy. Types of surgery vary from breast-conserving surgery to mastectomy. Breast reconstruction may take place at the time of surgery or at a later date. In those in whom the cancer has spread to other parts of the body, treatments are mostly aimed at improving quality of life and comfort.

Outcomes for breast cancer vary depending on the cancer type, the extent of disease, and the person's age. The five-year survival rates in England and the United States are between 80 and 90%. In developing countries, five-year survival rates are lower. Worldwide, breast cancer is the leading type of cancer in women, accounting for 25% of all cases. In 2018, it resulted in 2 million new cases and 627,000 deaths. It is more common in developed countries and is more than 100 times more common in women than in men.

Signs and symptoms 

Breast cancer most commonly presents as a lump that feels different from the rest of the breast tissue. More than 80% of cases are discovered when a person detects such a lump with the fingertips. The earliest breast cancers, however, are detected by a mammogram. Lumps found in lymph nodes located in the armpits may also indicate breast cancer.

Indications of breast cancer other than a lump may include thickening different from the other breast tissue, one breast becoming larger or lower, a nipple changing position or shape or becoming inverted, skin puckering or dimpling, a rash on or around a nipple, discharge from nipple/s, constant pain in part of the breast or armpit and swelling beneath the armpit or around the collarbone. Pain ("mastodynia") is an unreliable tool in determining the presence or absence of breast cancer, but may be indicative of other breast health issues.

Another symptom complex of breast cancer is Paget's disease of the breast. This syndrome presents as skin changes resembling eczema; such as redness, discoloration or mild flaking of the nipple skin. As Paget's disease of the breast advances, symptoms may include tingling, itching, increased sensitivity, burning, and pain. There may also be discharge from the nipple. Approximately half the women diagnosed with Paget's disease of the breast also have a lump in the breast.

Inflammatory breast cancer is a rare (only seen in less than 5% of breast cancer diagnosis) yet aggressive form of breast cancer characterized by the swollen, red areas formed on the top of the breast. The visual effects of inflammatory breast cancer is a result of a blockage of lymph vessels by cancer cells. This type of breast cancer is seen in more commonly diagnosed in younger ages, obese women and African American women. As inflammatory breast cancer does not present as a lump there can sometimes be a delay in diagnosis.

Mammary secretory carcinoma (MSC) is a rare form of the secretory carcinomas that occurs exclusively in the breast. It usually develops in adults but in a significant percentage of cases  also affects children: MSC accounts for 80% of all childhood breast cancers. MSC lesions are typically slow growing, painless, small ductal breast tumours that have invaded the tissue around their ducts of origin, often spread to sentinel lymph nodes and/or axillary lymph nodes, but rarely metastasized to distant tissues. These tumours typically have distinctive microscopic features and tumour cells that carry a balanced genetic translocation in which part of the NTRK3 gene is fused to part of the ETV6 gene to form a fusion gene, ETV6-NTRK3. This fusion gene encodes a chimeric protein termed ETV6-NTRK3. The NTRK3 part of ETV6-NTRK3 protein has up-regulated tyrosine kinase activity that stimulates two signaling pathways, the PI3K/AKT/mTOR and MAPK/ERK pathways, which promote cell proliferation and survival and thereby may contribute to the development of MSC. Conservative surgery, modified radical mastectomy, and radical mastectomy have been the most frequent procedures used to treat adults, while simple mastectomy, local excision with sentinel lymph node biopsy, and complete axillary dissection have been recommended to treat children with MSC. In all cases, long-term, e.g. >20 years, follow-up examinations are recommended. The relatively rare cases of MSC that have metastasized to distant tissues have shown little or no responses to chemotherapy and radiotherapy. Three patients with metastatic disease had good partial responses to Entrectinib, a drug that inhibits the tyrosine kinase activity of the ETV6-NTRK3 fusion protein. Because of its slow growth and low rate of metastasis to distant tissues, individuals with MSC have had 20 year survival rates of 93.16%.

In rare cases, what initially appears as a fibroadenoma (hard, movable non-cancerous lump) could in fact be a phyllodes tumour. Phyllodes tumours are formed within the stroma (connective tissue) of the breast and contain glandular as well as stromal tissue. Phyllodes tumours are not staged in the usual sense; they are classified on the basis of their appearance under the microscope as benign, borderline or malignant.

Malignant tumours can result in metastatic tumours – secondary tumours (originating from the primary tumour) that spread beyond the site of origination. The symptoms caused by metastatic breast cancer will depend on the location of metastasis. Common sites of metastasis include bone, liver, lung, and brain. When cancer has reached such an invasive state, it is categorized as a stage 4 cancer, cancers of this state are often fatal. Common symptoms of stage 4 cancer include unexplained weight loss, bone and joint pain, jaundice and neurological symptoms. These symptoms are called non-specific symptoms because they could be manifestations of many other illnesses. Rarely breast cancer can spread to exceedingly uncommon sites such as peripancreatic lymph nodes causing biliary obstruction leading to diagnostic difficulties.

Most symptoms of breast disorders, including most lumps, do not turn out to represent underlying breast cancer. Less than 20% of lumps, for example, are cancerous, and benign breast diseases such as mastitis and fibroadenoma of the breast are more common causes of breast disorder symptoms.

Risk factors 

Risk factors can be divided into two categories:
 modifiable risk factors (things that people can change themselves, such as consumption of alcoholic beverages), and
 fixed risk factors (things that cannot be changed, such as age and physiological sex).
The primary risk factors for breast cancer are being female and older age. Other potential risk factors include genetics, lack of childbearing or lack of breastfeeding, higher levels of certain hormones, certain dietary patterns, and obesity. One study indicates that exposure to light pollution is a risk factor for the development of breast cancer.

If all adults maintained the healthiest possible lifestyles, including not drinking alcoholic beverages, maintaining a healthy body composition, never smoking, eating healthful food, and other actions, then almost a quarter of breast cancer cases worldwide could be prevented. The remaining three-quarters of breast cancer cases cannot be prevented through lifestyle changes.

Lifestyle 

Drinking alcoholic beverages increases the risk of breast cancer, even among very light drinkers (women drinking less than half of one alcoholic drink per day). The risk is highest among heavy drinkers. Globally, about one in 10 cases of breast cancer is caused by women drinking alcoholic beverages. Drinking alcoholic beverages is among the most common modifiable risk factors.

The correlation between obesity and breast cancer is anything but linear. Studies show that those who rapidly gain weight in adulthood are at higher risk than those who have been overweight since childhood. Likewise excess fat in the midsection seems to induce a higher risk than excess weight carried in the lower body. This implies that the food one eats is of greater importance than one's BMI. Dietary factors that may increase risk include a high-fat diet and obesity-related high cholesterol levels. Dietary iodine deficiency may also play a role. Evidence for fiber is unclear. A 2015 review found that studies trying to link fiber intake with breast cancer produced mixed results. In 2016, a tentative association between low fiber intake during adolescence and breast cancer was observed.

Smoking tobacco appears to increase the risk of breast cancer, with the greater the amount smoked and the earlier in life that smoking began, the higher the risk. In those who are long-term smokers, the relative risk is increased 35% to 50%.

A lack of physical activity has been linked to about 10% of cases. Sitting regularly for prolonged periods is associated with higher mortality from breast cancer. The risk is not negated by regular exercise, though it is lowered.

Hormone therapy to treat menopause is also associated with an increased risk of breast cancer. The use of hormonal birth control does not cause breast cancer for most women; if it has an effect, it is small (on the order of 0.01% per user–year; comparable to the rate of maternal mortality in the United States), temporary, and offset by the users' significantly reduced risk of ovarian and endometrial cancers. Among those with a family history of breast cancer, use of modern oral contraceptives does not appear to affect the risk of breast cancer. It is less certain whether hormonal contraceptives could increase the already high rates of breast cancer in women with mutations in the breast cancer susceptibility genes BRCA1 or BRCA2.

Breast feeding reduces the risk of several types of cancers, including breast cancer. In the 1980s, the abortion–breast cancer hypothesis posited that induced abortion increased the risk of developing breast cancer. This hypothesis was the subject of extensive scientific inquiry, which concluded that neither miscarriages nor abortions are associated with a heightened risk for breast cancer.

Other risk factors include radiation and circadian disruptions related to shift-work and routine late-night eating. A number of chemicals have also been linked, including polychlorinated biphenyls, polycyclic aromatic hydrocarbons, and organic solvents Although the radiation from mammography is a low dose, it is estimated that yearly screening from 40 to 80 years of age will cause approximately 225 cases of fatal breast cancer per million women screened.

Genetics 

Genetics is believed to be the primary cause of 5–10% of all cases. Women whose mother was diagnosed before 50 have an increased risk of 1.7 and those whose mother was diagnosed at age 50 or after has an increased risk of 1.4. In those with zero, one or two affected relatives, the risk of breast cancer before the age of 80 is 7.8%, 13.3%, and 21.1% with a subsequent mortality from the disease of 2.3%, 4.2%, and 7.6% respectively. In those with a first degree relative with the disease the risk of breast cancer between the age of 40 and 50 is double that of the general population.

In less than 5% of cases, genetics plays a more significant role by causing a hereditary breast–ovarian cancer syndrome. This includes those who carry the BRCA1 and BRCA2 gene mutation. These mutations account for up to 90% of the total genetic influence with a risk of breast cancer of 60–80% in those affected. Other significant mutations include p53 (Li–Fraumeni syndrome), PTEN (Cowden syndrome), and STK11 (Peutz–Jeghers syndrome), CHEK2, ATM, BRIP1, and PALB2. In 2012, researchers said that there are four genetically distinct types of the breast cancer and that in each type, hallmark genetic changes lead to many cancers.

Other genetic predispositions include the density of the breast tissue and hormonal levels. Women with dense breast tissue are more likely to get tumours and are less likely to be diagnosed with breast cancer – because the dense tissue makes tumours less visible on mammograms. Furthermore, women with naturally high estrogen and progesterone levels are also at higher risk for tumour development.

Medical conditions 

Breast changes like atypical ductal hyperplasia and lobular carcinoma in situ, found in benign breast conditions such as fibrocystic breast changes, are correlated with an increased breast cancer risk.

Diabetes mellitus might also increase the risk of breast cancer. Autoimmune diseases such as lupus erythematosus seem also to increase the risk for the acquisition of breast cancer.

The major causes of sporadic breast cancer are associated with hormone levels. Breast cancer is promoted by estrogen. This hormone activates the development of breast throughout puberty, menstrual cycles and pregnancy. The imbalance between estrogen and progesterone during the menstrual phases causes cell proliferation. Moreover, oxidative metabolites of estrogen can increase DNA damage and mutations. Repeated cycling and the impairment of repair process can transform a normal cell into pre-malignant and eventually malignant cell through mutation. During the premalignant stage, high proliferation of stromal cells can be activated by estrogen to support the development of breast cancer. During the ligand binding activation, the ER can regulate gene expression by interacting with estrogen response elements within the promotor of specific genes. The expression and activation of ER due to lack of estrogen can be stimulated by extracellular signals. Interestingly, the ER directly binding with the several proteins, including growth factor receptors, can promote the expression of genes related to cell growth and survival.

Raised prolactin levels in the blood are associated with increased risk of breast cancer. A meta-analysis of observational research with over two million individuals has suggested a moderate association of antipsychotic use with breast cancer, possibly mediated by prolactin-inducing properties of specific agents.

Pathophysiology 

Breast cancer, like other cancers, occurs because of an interaction between an environmental (external) factor and a genetically susceptible host. Normal cells divide as many times as needed and stop. They attach to other cells and stay in place in tissues. Cells become cancerous when they lose their ability to stop dividing, to attach to other cells, to stay where they belong, and to die at the proper time.

Normal cells will self-destruct (programmed cell death) when they are no longer needed. Until then, cells are protected from programmed death by several protein clusters and pathways. One of the protective pathways is the PI3K/AKT pathway; another is the RAS/MEK/ERK pathway. Sometimes the genes along these protective pathways are mutated in a way that turns them permanently "on", rendering the cell incapable of self-destructing when it is no longer needed. This is one of the steps that causes cancer in combination with other mutations. Normally, the PTEN protein turns off the PI3K/AKT pathway when the cell is ready for programmed cell death. In some breast cancers, the gene for the PTEN protein is mutated, so the PI3K/AKT pathway is stuck in the "on" position, and the cancer cell does not self-destruct.

Mutations that can lead to breast cancer have been experimentally linked to estrogen exposure. Additionally, G-protein coupled estrogen receptors have been associated with various cancers of the female reproductive system including breast cancer.

Abnormal growth factor signaling in the interaction between stromal cells and epithelial cells can facilitate malignant cell growth. In breast adipose tissue, overexpression of leptin leads to increased cell proliferation and cancer.

In the United States, 10 to 20 percent of women with breast cancer or ovarian cancer have a first- or second-degree relative with one of these diseases. Men with breast cancer have an even higher likelihood. The familial tendency to develop these cancers is called hereditary breast–ovarian cancer syndrome. The best known of these, the BRCA mutations, confer a lifetime risk of breast cancer of between 60 and 85 percent and a lifetime risk of ovarian cancer of between 15 and 40 percent. Some mutations associated with cancer, such as p53, BRCA1 and BRCA2, occur in mechanisms to correct errors in DNA. These mutations are either inherited or acquired after birth. Presumably, they allow further mutations, which allow uncontrolled division, lack of attachment, and metastasis to distant organs. However, there is strong evidence of residual risk variation that goes well beyond hereditary BRCA gene mutations between carrier families. This is caused by unobserved risk factors. This implicates environmental and other causes as triggers for breast cancers. The inherited mutation in BRCA1 or BRCA2 genes can interfere with repair of DNA cross links and DNA double strand breaks (known functions of the encoded protein). These carcinogens cause DNA damage such as DNA cross links and double strand breaks that often require repairs by pathways containing BRCA1 and BRCA2. However, mutations in BRCA genes account for only 2 to 3 percent of all breast cancers. Levin et al. say that cancer may not be inevitable for all carriers of BRCA1 and BRCA2 mutations. About half of hereditary breast–ovarian cancer syndromes involve unknown genes. Furthermore, certain latent viruses, may decrease the expression of the BRCA1 gene and increase the risk of breast tumours.

GATA-3 directly controls the expression of estrogen receptor (ER) and other genes associated with epithelial differentiation, and the loss of GATA-3 leads to loss of differentiation and poor prognosis due to cancer cell invasion and metastasis.

Diagnosis 

Most types of breast cancer are easy to diagnose by microscopic analysis of a sample – or biopsy – of the affected area of the breast. Also, there are types of breast cancer that require specialized lab exams.

The two most commonly used screening methods, physical examination of the breasts by a healthcare provider and mammography, can offer an approximate likelihood that a lump is cancer, and may also detect some other lesions, such as a simple cyst. When these examinations are inconclusive, a healthcare provider can remove a sample of the fluid in the lump for microscopic analysis (a procedure known as fine needle aspiration, or fine needle aspiration and cytology, FNAC) to help establish the diagnosis. A needle aspiration can be performed in a healthcare provider's office or clinic. A local anesthetic may be used to numb the breast tissue to prevent pain during the procedure, but may not be necessary if the lump is not beneath the skin. A finding of clear fluid makes the lump highly unlikely to be cancerous, but bloody fluid may be sent off for inspection under a microscope for cancerous cells. Together, physical examination of the breasts, mammography, and FNAC can be used to diagnose breast cancer with a good degree of accuracy.

Other options for biopsy include a core biopsy or vacuum-assisted breast biopsy, which are procedures in which a section of the breast lump is removed; or an excisional biopsy, in which the entire lump is removed. Very often the results of physical examination by a healthcare provider, mammography, and additional tests that may be performed in special circumstances (such as imaging by ultrasound or MRI) are sufficient to warrant excisional biopsy as the definitive diagnostic and primary treatment method.

Classification 

Breast cancers are classified by several grading systems. Each of these influences the prognosis and can affect treatment response. Description of a breast cancer optimally includes all of these factors.

 Histopathology. Breast cancer is usually classified primarily by its histological appearance. Most breast cancers are derived from the epithelium lining the ducts or lobules, and these cancers are classified as ductal or lobular carcinoma. Carcinoma in situ is growth of low-grade cancerous or precancerous cells within a particular tissue compartment such as the mammary duct without invasion of the surrounding tissue. In contrast, invasive carcinoma does not confine itself to the initial tissue compartment.
 Grade. Grading compares the appearance of the breast cancer cells to the appearance of normal breast tissue. Normal cells in an organ like the breast become differentiated, meaning that they take on specific shapes and forms that reflect their function as part of that organ. Cancerous cells lose that differentiation. In cancer, the cells that would normally line up in an orderly way to make up the milk ducts become disorganized. Cell division becomes uncontrolled. Cell nuclei become less uniform. Pathologists describe cells as well differentiated (low grade), moderately differentiated (intermediate grade), and poorly differentiated (high grade) as the cells progressively lose the features seen in normal breast cells. Poorly differentiated cancers (the ones whose tissue is least like normal breast tissue) have a worse prognosis.
 Stage. Breast cancer staging using the TNM system is based on the size of the tumour (T), whether or not the tumour has spread to the lymph nodes (N) in the armpits, and whether the tumour has metastasized (M) (i.e. spread to a more distant part of the body). Larger size, nodal spread, and metastasis have a larger stage number and a worse prognosis. The main stages are:
 Stage 0 is a pre-cancerous or marker condition, either ductal carcinoma in situ (DCIS) or lobular carcinoma in situ (LCIS).
 Stages 1–3 are within the breast or regional lymph nodes.
 Stage 4 is 'metastatic' cancer that has a less favorable prognosis since it has spread beyond the breast and regional lymph nodes. 

Where available, imaging studies may be employed as part of the staging process in select cases to look for signs of metastatic cancer. However, in cases of breast cancer with low risk for metastasis, the risks associated with PET scans, CT scans, or bone scans outweigh the possible benefits, as these procedures expose the person to a substantial amount of potentially dangerous ionizing radiation.
 Receptor status. Breast cancer cells have receptors on their surface and in their cytoplasm and nucleus. Chemical messengers such as hormones bind to receptors, and this causes changes in the cell. Breast cancer cells may or may not have three important receptors: estrogen receptor (ER), progesterone receptor (PR), and HER2. ER+ cancer cells (that is, cancer cells that have estrogen receptors) depend on estrogen for their growth, so they can be treated with drugs to block estrogen effects (e.g. tamoxifen), and generally have a better prognosis. Untreated, HER2+ breast cancers are generally more aggressive than HER2- breast cancers, but HER2+ cancer cells respond to drugs such as the monoclonal antibody trastuzumab (in combination with conventional chemotherapy), and this has improved the prognosis significantly. Cells that do not have any of these three receptor types (estrogen receptors, progesterone receptors, or HER2) are called triple-negative, although they frequently do express receptors for other hormones, such as androgen receptor and prolactin receptor.
 DNA assays. DNA testing of various types including DNA microarrays have compared normal cells to breast cancer cells. The specific changes in a particular breast cancer can be used to classify the cancer in several ways, and may assist in choosing the most effective treatment for that DNA type.

Screening 

Breast cancer screening refers to testing otherwise-healthy women for breast cancer in an attempt to achieve an earlier diagnosis under the assumption that early detection will improve outcomes. A number of screening tests have been employed including clinical and self breast exams, mammography, genetic screening, ultrasound, and magnetic resonance imaging.

A clinical or self breast exam involves feeling the breast for lumps or other abnormalities. Clinical breast exams are performed by health care providers, while self-breast exams are performed by the person themselves. Evidence does not support the effectiveness of either type of breast exam, as by the time a lump is large enough to be found it is likely to have been growing for several years and thus soon be large enough to be found without an exam. Mammographic screening for breast cancer uses X-rays to examine the breast for any uncharacteristic masses or lumps. During a screening, the breast is compressed and a technician takes photos from multiple angles. A general mammogram takes photos of the entire breast, while a diagnostic mammogram focuses on a specific lump or area of concern.

A number of national bodies recommend breast cancer screening. For the average woman, the U.S. Preventive Services Task Force and American College of Physicians recommends mammography every two years in women between the ages of 50 and 74, the Council of Europe recommends mammography between 50 and 69 with most programs using a 2-year frequency, while the European Commission recommends mammography from 45 to 75 every 2 to 3 years, and in Canada screening is recommended between the ages of 50 and 74 at a frequency of 2 to 3 years. The American Cancer Society also endorses that women ages 40 and older receive mammograms annually. These task force reports point out that in addition to unnecessary surgery and anxiety, the risks of more frequent mammograms include a small but significant increase in breast cancer induced by radiation.

The Cochrane collaboration (2013) states that the best quality evidence neither demonstrates a reduction in cancer specific, nor a reduction in all cause mortality from screening mammography. When less rigorous trials are added to the analysis there is a reduction in mortality due to breast cancer of 0.05% (a decrease of 1 in 2000 deaths from breast cancer over 10 years or a relative decrease of 15% from breast cancer). Screening over 10 years results in a 30% increase in rates of over-diagnosis and over-treatment (3 to 14 per 1000) and more than half will have at least one falsely positive test. This has resulted in the view that it is not clear whether mammography screening does more good or harm. Cochrane states that, due to recent improvements in breast cancer treatment, and the risks of false positives from breast cancer screening leading to unnecessary treatment, "it therefore no longer seems beneficial to attend for breast cancer screening" at any age. Whether MRI as a screening method has greater harms or benefits when compared to standard mammography is not known.

Prevention

Lifestyle 
Women can reduce their risk of breast cancer by maintaining a healthy weight, reducing alcohol use, increasing physical activity, and breast-feeding. These modifications might prevent 38% of breast cancers in the US, 42% in the UK, 28% in Brazil, and 20% in China. The benefits with moderate exercise such as brisk walking are seen at all age groups including postmenopausal women. High levels of physical activity reduce the risk of breast cancer by about 14%. Strategies that encourage regular physical activity and reduce obesity could also have other benefits, such as reduced risks of cardiovascular disease and diabetes. A study that included data from 130,957 women of European ancestry found "strong evidence that greater levels of physical activity and less sedentary time are likely to reduce breast cancer risk, with results generally consistent across breast cancer subtypes".

The American Cancer Society and the American Society of Clinical Oncology advised in 2016 that people should eat a diet high in vegetables, fruits, whole grains, and legumes. High intake of citrus fruit has been associated with a 10% reduction in the risk of breast cancer. Marine omega-3 polyunsaturated fatty acids appear to reduce the risk. High consumption of soy-based foods may reduce risk.

Pre-emptive surgery 
Removal of both breasts before any cancer has been diagnosed or any suspicious lump or other lesion has appeared (a procedure known as "prophylactic bilateral mastectomy" or "risk reducing mastectomy") may be considered in women with BRCA1 and BRCA2 mutations, which are associated with a substantially heightened risk for an eventual diagnosis of breast cancer. Evidence is not strong enough to support this procedure in anyone but women at the highest risk. BRCA testing is recommended in those with a high family risk after genetic counseling. It is not recommended routinely. This is because there are many forms of changes in BRCA genes, ranging from harmless polymorphisms to obviously dangerous frameshift mutations. The effect of most of the identifiable changes in the genes is uncertain. Testing in an average-risk person is particularly likely to return one of these indeterminate, useless results. Removing the second breast in a person who has breast cancer (contralateral risk‐reducing mastectomy or CRRM) may reduce the risk of cancer in the second breast, however, it is unclear if removing the second breast in those who have breast cancer improves survival. An increasing number women who test positive for faulty BRCA1 or BRCA2 genes choose to have risk-reducing surgery. At the same time the average waiting time for undergoing the procedure is two-years which is much longer than recommended.

Medications 
The selective estrogen receptor modulators reduce the risk of breast cancer but increase the risk of thromboembolism and endometrial cancer. There is no overall change in the risk of death. They are thus not recommended for the prevention of breast cancer in women at average risk but it is recommended they be offered for those at high risk and over the age of 35. The benefit of breast cancer reduction continues for at least five years after stopping a course of treatment with these medications. Aromatase inhibitors (such as exemestane and anastrozole) may be more effective than selective estrogen receptor modulators (such as tamoxifen) at reducing breast cancer risk and they are not associated with an increased risk of endometrial cancer and thromboembolism.

Management 

The management of breast cancer depends on various factors, including the stage of the cancer and the person's age. Treatments are more aggressive when the cancer is more advanced or there is a higher risk of recurrence of the cancer following treatment.

Breast cancer is usually treated with surgery, which may be followed by chemotherapy or radiation therapy, or both. A multidisciplinary approach is preferable. Hormone receptor-positive cancers are often treated with hormone-blocking therapy over courses of several years. Monoclonal antibodies, or other immune-modulating treatments, may be administered in certain cases of metastatic and other advanced stages of breast cancer, although this range of treatment is still being studied.

Surgery 

Surgery involves the physical removal of the tumour, typically along with some of the surrounding tissue. One or more lymph nodes may be biopsied during the surgery; increasingly the lymph node sampling is performed by a sentinel lymph node biopsy.

Standard surgeries include:
 Mastectomy: Removal of the whole breast.
 Quadrantectomy: Removal of one-quarter of the breast.
 Lumpectomy: Removal of a small part of the breast.
Once the tumour has been removed, if the person desires, breast reconstruction surgery, a type of plastic surgery, may then be performed to improve the aesthetic appearance of the treated site.
Alternatively, women use breast prostheses to simulate a breast under clothing, or choose a flat chest. Nipple prosthesis can be used at any time following the mastectomy.

Medication 

Medications used after and in addition to surgery are called adjuvant therapy. Chemotherapy or other types of therapy prior to surgery are called neoadjuvant therapy. Aspirin may reduce mortality from breast cancer when used with other treatments.

There are currently three main groups of medications used for adjuvant breast cancer treatment: hormone-blocking agents, chemotherapy, and monoclonal antibodies.

Hormonal therapy
Some breast cancers require estrogen to continue growing. They can be identified by the presence of estrogen receptors (ER+) and progesterone receptors (PR+) on their surface (sometimes referred to together as hormone receptors). These ER+ cancers can be treated with drugs that either block the receptors, e.g. tamoxifen, or alternatively block the production of estrogen with an aromatase inhibitor, e.g. anastrozole or letrozole. The use of tamoxifen is recommended for 10 years. Tamoxifen increases the risk of postmenopausal bleeding, endometrial polyps, hyperplasia, and endometrial cancer; using tamoxifen with an intrauterine system releasing levonorgestrel might increase vaginal bleeding after one to two years, but reduces somewhat endometrial polyps and hyperplasia, but not necessarily endometrial cancer. Letrozole is recommended for five years.

Aromatase inhibitors are only suitable for women after menopause; however, in this group, they appear better than tamoxifen. This is because the active aromatase in postmenopausal women is different from the prevalent form in premenopausal women, and therefore these agents are ineffective in inhibiting the predominant aromatase of premenopausal women. Aromatase inhibitors should not be given to premenopausal women with intact ovarian function (unless they are also on treatment to stop their ovaries from working). CDK inhibitors can be used in combination with endocrine or aromatase therapy.

Chemotherapy
Chemotherapy is predominantly used for cases of breast cancer in stages 2–4, and is particularly beneficial in estrogen receptor-negative (ER-) disease. The chemotherapy medications are administered in combinations, usually for periods of 3–6 months. One of the most common regimens, known as "AC", combines cyclophosphamide with doxorubicin. Sometimes a taxane drug, such as docetaxel, is added, and the regime is then known as "CAT". Another common treatment is cyclophosphamide, methotrexate, and fluorouracil (or "CMF"). Most chemotherapy medications work by destroying fast-growing and/or fast-replicating cancer cells, either by causing DNA damage upon replication or by other mechanisms. However, the medications also damage fast-growing normal cells, which may cause serious side effects. Damage to the heart muscle is the most dangerous complication of doxorubicin, for example.

Monoclonal antibodies
Trastuzumab, a monoclonal antibody to HER2, has improved the five-year disease free survival of stage 1–3 HER2-positive breast cancers to about 87% (overall survival 95%). Between 25% and 30% of breast cancers overexpress the HER2 gene or its protein product, and overexpression of HER2 in breast cancer is associated with increased disease recurrence and worse prognosis. Trastuzumab, however, is very expensive, and its use may cause serious side effects (approximately 2% of people who receive it develop significant heart damage). Another antibody pertuzumab prevents HER2 dimerization and is recommended together with trastuzumab and chemotherapy in severe disease.

Targeted therapy 
Elacestrant (Orserdu) was approved for medical use in the United States in January 2023.

Radiation 

Radiotherapy is given after surgery to the region of the tumour bed and regional lymph nodes, to destroy microscopic tumour cells that may have escaped surgery. When given intraoperatively as targeted intraoperative radiotherapy, it may also have a beneficial effect on tumour microenvironment. Radiation therapy can be delivered as external beam radiotherapy or as brachytherapy (internal radiotherapy). Conventionally radiotherapy is given after the operation for breast cancer. Radiation can also be given at the time of operation on the breast cancer. Radiation can reduce the risk of recurrence by 50–66% (1/2 – 2/3 reduction of risk) when delivered in the correct dose and is considered essential when breast cancer is treated by removing only the lump (Lumpectomy or Wide local excision). In early breast cancer, partial breast irradiation does not give the same cancer control in the breast as treating the whole breast and may cause worse side effects.

Follow-up care 

Care after primary breast cancer treatment, otherwise called 'follow-up care', can be intensive involving regular laboratory tests in asymptomatic people to try to achieve earlier detection of possible metastases. A review has found that follow-up programs involving regular physical examinations and yearly mammography alone are as effective as more intensive programs consisting of laboratory tests in terms of early detection of recurrence, overall survival and quality of life.

Multidisciplinary rehabilitation programmes, often including exercise, education and psychological help, may produce short-term improvements in functional ability, psychosocial adjustment and social participation in people with breast cancer.

Upper limb problems such as shoulder and arm pain, weakness and restricted movement are a common side effect after radiotherapy or breast cancer surgery. According to research in the UK, an exercise programme started 7–10 days after surgery can reduce upper limb problems.

Prognosis

Prognostic factors 

The stage of the breast cancer is the most important component of traditional classification methods of breast cancer, because it has a greater effect on the prognosis than the other considerations. Staging takes into consideration size, local involvement, lymph node status and whether metastatic disease is present. The higher the stage at diagnosis, the poorer the prognosis. The stage is raised by the invasiveness of disease to lymph nodes, chest wall, skin or beyond, and the aggressiveness of the cancer cells. The stage is lowered by the presence of cancer-free zones and close-to-normal cell behaviour (grading). Size is not a factor in staging unless the cancer is invasive. For example, ductal carcinoma in situ (DCIS) involving the entire breast will still be stage zero and consequently an excellent prognosis.

 Stage 1 cancers (and DCIS, LCIS) have an excellent prognosis and are generally treated with lumpectomy and sometimes radiation. 
 Stage 2 and 3 cancers with a progressively poorer prognosis and greater risk of recurrence are generally treated with surgery (lumpectomy or mastectomy with or without lymph node removal), chemotherapy (plus trastuzumab for HER2+ cancers) and sometimes radiation (particularly following large cancers, multiple positive nodes or lumpectomy).
 Stage 4, metastatic cancer, (i.e. spread to distant sites) has a poor prognosis and is managed by various combination of all treatments from surgery, radiation, chemotherapy and targeted therapies. 

The breast cancer grade is assessed by comparison of the breast cancer cells to normal breast cells. The closer to normal the cancer cells are, the slower their growth and the better the prognosis. If cells are not well differentiated, they will appear immature, will divide more rapidly, and will tend to spread. Well differentiated is given a grade of 1, moderate is grade 2, while poor or undifferentiated is given a higher grade of 3 or 4 (depending upon the scale used). The most widely used grading system is the Nottingham scheme.

Younger women with an age of less than 40 years or women over 80 years tend to have a poorer prognosis than post-menopausal women due to several factors. Their breasts may change with their menstrual cycles, they may be nursing infants, and they may be unaware of changes in their breasts. Therefore, younger women are usually at a more advanced stage when diagnosed. There may also be biological factors contributing to a higher risk of disease recurrence for younger women with breast cancer.

Psychological aspects 
Not all people with breast cancer experience their illness in the same manner. Factors such as age can have a significant impact on the way a person copes with a breast cancer diagnosis. Premenopausal women with estrogen-receptor positive breast cancer must confront the issues of early menopause induced by many of the chemotherapy regimens used to treat their breast cancer, especially those that use hormones to counteract ovarian function.

In women with non-metastatic breast cancer, psychological interventions such as cognitive behavioral therapy can have positive effects on outcomes such as anxiety, depression and mood disturbance. Physical activity interventions may also have beneficial effects on health related quality of life, anxiety, fitness and physical activity in women with breast cancer following adjuvant therapy.

Epidemiology 

Worldwide, breast cancer is the most-common invasive cancer in women. Along with lung cancer, breast cancer is the most commonly diagnosed cancer, with 2.09 million cases each in 2018. Breast cancer affects 1 in 7 (14%) of women worldwide. (The most common form of cancer is non-invasive non-melanoma skin cancer; non-invasive cancers are generally easily cured, cause very few deaths, and are routinely excluded from cancer statistics.) Breast cancer comprises 22.9% of invasive cancers in women and 16% of all female cancers. In 2012, it comprised 25.2% of cancers diagnosed in women, making it the most-common female cancer.

In 2008, breast cancer caused 458,503 deaths worldwide (13.7% of cancer deaths in women and 6.0% of all cancer deaths for men and women together). Lung cancer, the second most-common cause of cancer-related deaths in women, caused 12.8% of cancer deaths in women (18.2% of all cancer deaths for men and women together).

The incidence of breast cancer varies greatly around the world: it is lowest in less-developed countries and greatest in the more-developed countries. In the twelve world regions, the annual age-standardized incidence rates per 100,000 women are as follows: 18 in Eastern Asia, 22 in South Central Asia and sub-Saharan Africa, 26 in South-Eastern Asia, 26, 28 in North Africa and Western Asia, 42 in South and Central America, 42, 49 in Eastern Europe, 56 in Southern Europe, 73 in Northern Europe, 74 in Oceania, 78 in Western Europe, and 90 in North America. Metastatic breast cancer affects between 19% (United States) and 50% (parts of Africa) of women with breast cancer.

The number of cases worldwide has significantly increased since the 1970s, a phenomenon partly attributed to the modern lifestyles. Breast cancer is strongly related to age with only 5% of all breast cancers occurring in women under 40 years old. There were more than 41,000 newly diagnosed cases of breast cancer registered in England in 2011, around 80% of these cases were in women age 50 or older. Based on U.S. statistics in 2015 there were 2.8 million women affected by breast cancer. In the United States, the age-adjusted incidence of breast cancer per 100,000 women rose from around 102 cases per year in the 1970s to around 141 in the late-1990s, and has since fallen, holding steady around 125 since 2003. However, age-adjusted deaths from breast cancer per 100,000 women only rose slightly from 31.4 in 1975 to 33.2 in 1989 and have since declined steadily to 20.5 in 2014.

Multiple primary tumours 

Multiple primary tumours can arise in different sites (as opposed to a single tumour spreading). These tumours can occur in both breasts (bilateral tumours), in different quadrants of a single breast (multi-centric cancer), or separate tumours within a single breast quadrant (multi-focal cancer).

Incidence of multi-centric and multi-focal breast cancers (MMBC) is increasing, partly due to improving mammography technology. Incidence of MMBC is reported between 9 and 75% in high income countries, depending on criteria used. For instance, China reported that only 2% of patients are defined as MMBC. The reason for this difference is due to lack of uniformity in diagnosis. Therefore, standardised method and criteria should be made in order to define the incidence of MMBC correctly.

Mutations in tumour suppressor genes such as BRCA1 and BRCA2, the PI3K/AKT/mTOR pathway and PTEN can be related to formation of multiple primary breast cancers. Diagnosis occurs via the same modalities as other breast cancers.

Mastectomy is the standard surgical treatment for multi centric breast cancer patients.  Double lumpectomies, also labelled as breast conservative therapy (BCT), is an alternative and preferred surgical treatment to mastectomy for early stage multi centric breast cancer patients. The procedure of double lumpectomies involves the surgical ablation of the cancerous tumour foci and the surrounding breast tissues in different quadrant of the same breast. The benefits of double lumpectomies are the avoidance of breast reconstruction surgery and minimal breast scarring. However, it is not preferred for patients with more than two tumours within the same breast due to difficulty in removing all cancer cells. Patients with multiple primary breast tumours may receive treatments such as chemotherapy, radiotherapy and breast reconstruction surgery for the same indications as other breast cancer patients.

History 

Because of its visibility, breast cancer was the form of cancer most often described in ancient documents. Because autopsies were rare, cancers of the internal organs were essentially invisible to ancient medicine. Breast cancer, however, could be felt through the skin, and in its advanced state often developed into fungating lesions: the tumour would become necrotic (die from the inside, causing the tumour to appear to break up) and ulcerate through the skin, weeping fetid, dark fluid.

The oldest discovered evidence of breast cancer is from Egypt and dates back 4200 years, to the Sixth Dynasty. The study of a woman's remains from the necropolis of Qubbet el-Hawa showed the typical destructive damage due to metastatic spread. The Edwin Smith Papyrus describes eight cases of tumours or ulcers of the breast that were treated by cauterization. The writing says about the disease, "There is no treatment." For centuries, physicians described similar cases in their practices, with the same conclusion. Ancient medicine, from the time of the Greeks through the 17th century, was based on humoralism, and thus believed that breast cancer was generally caused by imbalances in the fundamental fluids that controlled the body, especially an excess of black bile. Alternatively it was seen as divine punishment.

Mastectomy for breast cancer was performed at least as early as AD 548, when it was proposed by the court physician Aetios of Amida to Theodora. It was not until doctors achieved greater understanding of the circulatory system in the 17th century that they could link breast cancer's spread to the lymph nodes in the armpit. In the early 18th century the French surgeon Jean Louis Petit performed total mastectomies that included removing the axillary lymph nodes, as he recognized that this reduced recurrence. Petit's work built on the methods of the surgeon Bernard Peyrilhe, who in the 17th century additionally removed the pectoral muscle underlying the breast, as he judged that this greatly improved the prognosis. But poor results and the considerable risk to the patient meant that physicians did not share the opinion of surgeons such as Nicolaes Tulp, who in the 17th century proclaimed "the sole remedy is a timely operation". The eminent surgeon Richard Wiseman documented in the mid 17th century that following 12 mastectomies, two patients died during the operation, eight patients died shortly after the operation from progressive cancer and only two of the 12 patients were cured. Physicians were conservative in the treatment they prescribed in the early stages of breast cancer. Patients were treated with a mixture of detox purges, blood letting and traditional remedies that were supposed to lower acidity, such as the alkaline arsenic.

When in 1664 Anne of Austria was diagnosed with breast cancer, the initial treatment involved compresses saturated with hemlock juice. When the lumps increased the King's physician commenced a treatment with arsenic ointments. The royal patient died 1666 in atrocious pain. Each failing treatment for breast cancer led to the search for new treatments, spurring a market in remedies that were advertised and sold by quacks, herbalists, chemists and apothecaries. The lack of anesthesia and antiseptics made mastectomy a painful and dangerous ordeal. In the 18th century, a wide variety of anatomical discoveries were accompanied by new theories about the cause and growth of breast cancer. The investigative surgeon John Hunter claimed that neural fluid generated breast cancer. Other surgeons proposed that milk within the mammary ducts led to cancerous growths. Theories about trauma to the breast as cause for malignant changes in breast tissue were advanced. The discovery of breast lumps and swellings fueled controversies about hard tumours and whether lumps were benign stages of cancer. Medical opinion about necessary immediate treatment varied. The surgeon Benjamin Bell advocated removal of the entire breast, even when only a portion was affected.

Breast cancer was uncommon until the 19th century, when improvements in sanitation and control of deadly infectious diseases resulted in dramatic increases in lifespan. Previously, most women had died too young to have developed breast cancer. In 1878, an article in Scientific American described historical treatment by pressure intended to induce local ischemia in cases when surgical removal were not possible. William Stewart Halsted started performing radical mastectomies in 1882, helped greatly by advances in general surgical technology, such as aseptic technique and anesthesia. The Halsted radical mastectomy often involved removing both breasts, associated lymph nodes, and the underlying chest muscles. This often led to long-term pain and disability, but was seen as necessary to prevent the cancer from recurring. Before the advent of the Halsted radical mastectomy, 20-year survival rates were only 10%; Halsted's surgery raised that rate to 50%.

Breast cancer staging systems were developed in the 1920s and 1930s to determining the extent to which a cancer has developed by growing and spreading. The first case-controlled study on breast cancer epidemiology was done by Janet Lane-Claypon, who published a comparative study in 1926 of 500 breast cancer cases and 500 controls of the same background and lifestyle for the British Ministry of Health. Radical mastectomies remained the standard of care in the USA until the 1970s, but in Europe, breast-sparing procedures, often followed by radiation therapy, were generally adopted in the 1950s. In 1955 George Crile Jr. published Cancer and Common Sense arguing that cancer patients needed to understand available treatment options. Crile became a close friend of the environmentalist Rachel Carson, who had undergone a Halsted radical mastectomy in 1960 to treat her malign breast cancer. The US oncologist Jerome Urban promoted superradical mastectomies, taking even more tissue, until 1963, when the ten-year survival rates proved equal to the less-damaging radical mastectomy. Carson died in 1964 and Crile went on to published a wide variety of articles, both in the popular press and in medical journals, challenging the widespread used of the Halsted radical mastectomy. In 1973 Crile published What Women Should Know About the Breast Cancer Controversy. When in 1974 Betty Ford was diagnosed with breast cancer, the options for treating breast cancer were openly discussed in the press. During the 1970s, a new understanding of metastasis led to perceiving cancer as a systemic illness as well as a localized one, and more sparing procedures were developed that proved equally effective.

In the 1980s and 1990s, thousands of women who had successfully completed standard treatment then demanded and received high-dose bone marrow transplants, thinking this would lead to better long-term survival. However, it proved completely ineffective, and 15–20% of women died because of the brutal treatment. The 1995 reports from the Nurses' Health Study and the 2002 conclusions of the Women's Health Initiative trial conclusively proved that hormone replacement therapy significantly increased the incidence of breast cancer.

Society and culture 

Before the 20th century, breast cancer was feared and discussed in hushed tones, as if it were shameful. As little could be safely done with primitive surgical techniques, women tended to suffer silently rather than seeking care. When surgery advanced, and long-term survival rates improved, women began raising awareness of the disease and the possibility of successful treatment. The "Women's Field Army", run by the American Society for the Control of Cancer (later the American Cancer Society) during the 1930s and 1940s was one of the first organized campaigns. In 1952, the first peer-to-peer support group, called "Reach to Recovery", began providing post-mastectomy, in-hospital visits from women who had survived breast cancer.

The breast cancer movement of the 1980s and 1990s developed out of the larger feminist movements and women's health movement of the 20th century. This series of political and educational campaigns, partly inspired by the politically and socially effective AIDS awareness campaigns, resulted in the widespread acceptance of second opinions before surgery, less invasive surgical procedures, support groups, and other advances in care.

Pink ribbon 

A pink ribbon is the most prominent symbol of breast cancer awareness. Pink ribbons, which can be made inexpensively, are sometimes sold as fundraisers, much like poppies on Remembrance Day. They may be worn to honor those who have been diagnosed with breast cancer, or to identify products that the manufacturer would like to sell to consumers that are interested in breast cancer. In the 1990s breast cancer awareness campaigns were launched by US based corporations. As part of these cause related marketing campaigns corporations donated to a variety of breast cancer initiatives for every pink ribbon product that was purchased.> The Wall Street Journal noted "that the strong emotions provoked by breast cancer translate to a company's bottom line". While many US corporations donated to existing breast cancer initiatives others such as Avon established their own breast cancer foundations on the back of pink ribbon products.

Wearing or displaying a pink ribbon has been criticized by the opponents of this practice as a kind of slacktivism, because it has no practical positive effect. It has also been criticized as hypocrisy, because some people wear the pink ribbon to show good will towards women with breast cancer, but then oppose these women's practical goals, like patient rights and anti-pollution legislation. Critics say that the feel-good nature of pink ribbons and pink consumption distracts society from the lack of progress on preventing and curing breast cancer. It is also criticized for reinforcing gender stereotypes and objectifying women and their breasts.< In 2002 Breast Cancer Action launched the "Think Before You Pink" campaign against pinkwashing to target businesses that have co-opted the pink campaign to promote products that cause breast cancer, such as alcoholic beverages.

Breast cancer culture 
In her 2006 book Pink Ribbons, Inc.: Breast Cancer and the Politics of Philanthropy Samantha King claimed that breast cancer has been transformed from a serious disease and individual tragedy to a market-driven industry of survivorship and corporate sales pitch. In 2010 Gayle Sulik argued that the primary purposes or goals of breast cancer culture are to maintain breast cancer's dominance as the pre-eminent women's health issue, to promote the appearance that society is doing something effective about breast cancer, and to sustain and expand the social, political, and financial power of breast cancer activists. In the same year Barbara Ehrenreich published an opinion piece in Harper's Magazine, lamenting that in breast cancer culture, breast cancer therapy is viewed as a rite of passage rather than a disease. To fit into this mold, the woman with breast cancer needs to normalize and feminize her appearance, and minimize the disruption that her health issues cause anyone else. Anger, sadness, and negativity must be silenced. As with most cultural models, people who conform to the model are given social status, in this case as cancer survivors. Women who reject the model are shunned, punished and shamed. The culture is criticized for treating adult women like little girls, as evidenced by "baby" toys such as pink teddy bears given to adult women.

Emphasis 
In 2009 the US science journalist Christie Aschwanden criticized that the emphasis on breast cancer screening may be harming women by subjecting them to unnecessary radiation, biopsies, and surgery. One-third of diagnosed breast cancers might recede on their own. Screening mammography efficiently finds non-life-threatening, asymptomatic breast cancers and precancers, even while overlooking serious cancers. According to the cancer researcher H. Gilbert Welch, screening mammography has taken the "brain-dead approach that says the best test is the one that finds the most cancers" rather than the one that finds dangerous cancers.

In 2002 it was noted that as a result of breast cancer's high visibility, the statistical results can be misinterpreted, such as the claim that one in eight women will be diagnosed with breast cancer during their lives – a claim that depends on the unrealistic assumption that no woman will die of any other disease before the age of 95. By 2010 the breast cancer survival rate in Europe was 91% at one years and 65% at five years. In the USA the five-year survival rate for localized breast cancer was 96.8%, while in cases of metastases it was only 20.6%. Because the prognosis for breast cancer was at this stage relatively favorable, compared to the prognosis for other cancers, breast cancer as cause of death among women was 13.9% of all cancer deaths. The second most common cause of death from cancer in women was lung cancer, the most common cancer worldwide for men and women. The improved survival rate made breast cancer the most prevalent cancer in the world. In 2010 an estimated 3.6 million women worldwide have had a breast cancer diagnosis in the past five years, while only 1.4 million male or female survivors from lung cancer were alive.

Health disparities in breast cancer 

There are ethnic disparities in the mortality rates for breast cancer as well as in breast cancer treatment. Breast cancer is the most prevalent cancer affecting women of every ethnic group in the United States. Breast cancer incidence among black women aged 45 and older is higher than that of white women in the same age group. White women aged 60–84 have higher incidence rates of breast cancer than Black women. Despite this, Black women at every age are more likely to succumb to breast cancer.
 
Breast cancer treatment has improved greatly in recent years, but black women are still less likely to obtain treatment compared to white women. Risk factors such as socioeconomic status, late-stage, or breast cancer at diagnosis, genetic differences in tumour subtypes, differences in health care access all contribute to these disparities. Socioeconomic determinants affecting the disparity in breast cancer illness include poverty, culture, as well as social injustice. In Hispanic women, the incidence of breast cancer is lower than in non-Hispanic women but is often diagnosed at a later stage than white women with larger tumors.

Black women are usually diagnosed with breast cancer at a younger age than white women. The median age of diagnosis for Black women is 59, in comparison to 62 in White women. The incidence of breast cancer in Black women has increased by 0.4% per year since 1975 and 1.5% per year among Asian/Pacific Islander women since 1992. Incidence rates were stable for non-Hispanic White, Hispanics, and Native women. The five-year survival rate is noted to be 81% in Black women and 92% in White women. Chinese and Japanese women have the highest survival rates.

Poverty is a major driver for disparities related to breast cancer. Low-income women are less likely to undergo breast cancer screening and thus are more likely to have a late-stage diagnosis. Ensuring women of all ethnic groups receive equitable health care including breast screening, can positively affect these disparities.

Pregnancy 

Pregnancy at an early age decreases the risk of developing breast cancer later in life. The risk of breast cancer also declines with the number of children a woman has. Breast cancer then becomes more common in the 5 or 10 years following pregnancy but then becomes less common than among the general population. These cancers are known as postpartum breast cancer and have worse outcomes including an increased risk of distant spread of disease and mortality. Other cancers found during or shortly after pregnancy appear at approximately the same rate as other cancers in women of a similar age.

Diagnosing new cancer in a pregnant woman is difficult, in part because any symptoms are commonly assumed to be a normal discomfort associated with pregnancy. As a result, cancer is typically discovered at a somewhat later stage than average in many pregnant or recently pregnant women. Some imaging procedures, such as MRIs (magnetic resonance imaging), CT scans, ultrasounds, and mammograms with fetal shielding are considered safe during pregnancy; some others, such as PET scans are not.

Treatment is generally the same as for non-pregnant women. However, radiation is normally avoided during pregnancy, especially if the fetal dose might exceed 100 cGy. In some cases, some or all treatments are postponed until after birth if the cancer is diagnosed late in the pregnancy. Early deliveries to speed the start of treatment are not uncommon. Surgery is generally considered safe during pregnancy, but some other treatments, especially certain chemotherapy drugs given during the first trimester, increase the risk of birth defects and pregnancy loss (spontaneous abortions and stillbirths). Elective abortions are not required and do not improve the likelihood of the mother surviving or being cured.

Radiation treatments may interfere with the mother's ability to breastfeed her baby because it reduces the ability of that breast to produce milk and increases the risk of mastitis. Also, when chemotherapy is being given after birth, many of the drugs pass through breast milk to the baby, which could harm the baby.

Regarding future pregnancy among breast cancer survivors, there is often fear of cancer recurrence. On the other hand, many still regard pregnancy and parenthood to represent normality, happiness and life fulfillment.

Hormones

Birth control 

In breast cancer survivors, non-hormonal birth control methods such as the copper intrauterine device (IUD) should be used as first-line options. Progestogen-based methods such as depot medroxyprogesterone acetate, IUD with progestogen or progestogen only pills have a poorly investigated but possible increased risk of cancer recurrence, but may be used if positive effects outweigh this possible risk.

Menopausal hormone replacement 

In breast cancer survivors, it is recommended to first consider non-hormonal options for menopausal effects, such as bisphosphonates or selective estrogen receptor modulators (SERMs) for osteoporosis, and vaginal estrogen for local symptoms. Observational studies of systemic hormone replacement therapy after breast cancer are generally reassuring. If hormone replacement is necessary after breast cancer, estrogen-only therapy or estrogen therapy with an intrauterine device with progestogen may be safer options than combined systemic therapy.

Research 
Treatments are being evaluated in clinical trials. This includes individual drugs, combinations of drugs, and surgical and radiation techniques Investigations include new types of targeted therapy, cancer vaccines, oncolytic virotherapy, gene therapy and immunotherapy.

The latest research is reported annually at scientific meetings such as that of the American Society of Clinical Oncology, San Antonio Breast Cancer Symposium, and the St. Gallen Oncology Conference in St. Gallen, Switzerland. These studies are reviewed by professional societies and other organizations, and formulated into guidelines for specific treatment groups and risk category.

Fenretinide, a retinoid, is also being studied as a way to reduce the risk of breast cancer. In particular, combinations of ribociclib plus endocrine therapy have been the subject of clinical trials.

A 2019 review found moderate certainty evidence that giving people antibiotics before breast cancer surgery helped to prevent surgical site infection (SSI). Further study is required to determine the most effective antibiotic protocol and use in women undergoing immediate breast reconstruction.

Cryoablation 
As of 2014 cryoablation is being studied to see if it could be a substitute for a lumpectomy in small cancers. There is tentative evidence in those with tumours less than 2 centimeters. It may also be used in those in who surgery is not possible. Another review states that cryoablation looks promising for early breast cancer of small size.

Breast cancer cell lines 

Part of the current knowledge on breast carcinomas is based on in vivo and in vitro studies performed with cell lines derived from breast cancers. These provide an unlimited source of homogenous self-replicating material, free of contaminating stromal cells, and often easily cultured in simple standard media. The first breast cancer cell line described, BT-20, was established in 1958. Since then, and despite sustained work in this area, the number of permanent lines obtained has been strikingly low (about 100). Indeed, attempts to culture breast cancer cell lines from primary tumours have been largely unsuccessful. This poor efficiency was often due to technical difficulties associated with the extraction of viable tumour cells from their surrounding stroma. Most of the available breast cancer cell lines issued from metastatic tumours, mainly from pleural effusions. Effusions provided generally large numbers of dissociated, viable tumour cells with little or no contamination by fibroblasts and other tumour stroma cells.
Many of the currently used BCC lines were established in the late 1970s. A very few of them, namely MCF-7, T-47D, MDA-MB-231 and SK-BR-3, account for more than two-thirds of all abstracts reporting studies on mentioned breast cancer cell lines, as concluded from a Medline-based survey.

Molecular markers

Metabolic markers 

Clinically, the most useful metabolic markers in breast cancer are the estrogen and progesterone receptors that are used to predict response to hormone therapy. New or potentially new markers for breast cancer include BRCA1 and BRCA2 to identify people at high risk of developing breast cancer, HER-2, and SCD1, for predicting response to therapeutic regimens, and urokinase plasminogen activator, PA1-1 and SCD1 for assessing prognosis.

Other animals 

 Mammary tumor for breast cancer in other animals
 Mouse models of breast cancer metastasis

References

External links 

 

 
Hereditary cancers
Human female endocrine system
Wikipedia medicine articles ready to translate